The Cascade torrent salamander (Rhyacotriton cascadae) is a species of salamander in the family Rhyacotritonidae. It is endemic to the Pacific Northwest in the United States where it is found from Skamania County in Washington south to Lane County in Oregon on the west slope of the Cascade Mountains.

Its natural habitats are temperate forests, rivers, and freshwater springs. It is threatened by habitat loss. These salamanders are typically  found under rocks and fallen logs. As far as movement, cascade torrent salamander can stay in a small area over very long periods. They also tend to move parallel to the streams they live by. Living by the stream creates a wide range of general lifespan because the salamanders can die from severe flooding of the stream.

References

Rhyacotriton
Amphibians of the United States
Endemic fauna of the United States
Amphibians described in 1992
Taxonomy articles created by Polbot